Charles Philip "Chick" Fullis (February 27, 1904 – March 28, 1946) was a professional baseball player. He played all or part of eight seasons in Major League Baseball for the New York Giants (1928–32), Philadelphia Phillies (1933–34) and St. Louis Cardinals (1934, 1936), primarily as a center fielder. Fullis batted and threw right-handed.

Born in Girardville, Pennsylvania, Fullis posted a .295 batting average with 12 home runs and 167 RBI in 590 games played during his career. He was a member of the Cardinals' 1934 World Series winners. Fullis was forced to retire at age 33 due to eye trouble.

Fullis' best season statistically came in 1933, the only season during his career in which he exceeded 100 games played. That year, he led the National League in at bats (647) and singles (162) while posting a .309 batting average with 200 hits, 91 runs, 45 RBI, 31 doubles and 18 stolen bases—all career highs. He also led all NL outfielders with 410 putouts.
 
Fullis died in Ashland, Pennsylvania, at the age of 42.

Notes

Sources
Baseball Almanac

Obituary listing at The Deadball Era

Major League Baseball center fielders
New York Giants (NL) players
Philadelphia Phillies players
St. Louis Cardinals players
Frederick Hustlers players
Macon Peaches players
Toledo Mud Hens players
Columbus Red Birds players
Baseball players from Pennsylvania
1904 births
1946 deaths
People from Schuylkill County, Pennsylvania